Brabeți may refer to several villages in Romania:

 Brabeți, a village in Bârla Commune, Argeș County
 Brabeți, a village in Daneți Commune, Dolj County